The Brazilian Guitar Quartet was formed in 1998 to interpret the repertoire for four guitars and make transcriptions of works from diverse periods and styles. The Brazilian Guitar Quartet is composed of: Clemer Andreotti, Luiz Mantovani, Everton Gloeden, and Tadeu do Amaral.

See also
Brahms guitar

External links
Official Website

New York Times review
Brazilian Guitar Quartet bio at Billboard 
 Hear Brazilian Guitar Quartet in concert  from WGBH Radio Boston
 Martin Woodhouse guitars

Brazilian musical groups
Musical groups established in 1998
Musical quartets
Latin Grammy Award winners
1998 establishments in Brazil